Kolle Lejserowitz (9 January 1923 – 9 December 1985) was a Danish wrestler. He competed in the men's Greco-Roman bantamweight at the 1948 Summer Olympics.

References

External links
 

1923 births
1985 deaths
Danish male sport wrestlers
Olympic wrestlers of Denmark
Wrestlers at the 1948 Summer Olympics
Sportspeople from Copenhagen